The Edward C. Peters House, also known as Ivy Hall, is a Queen Anne style house in Atlanta, Georgia. It occupies a lot covering an entire city block on the southeast corner of Piedmont Avenue and Ponce de Leon Avenue in Midtown Atlanta, just north of the SoNo neighborhood. Its current owner is the Savannah College of Art and Design.

History
The house was built in 1883 for Edward C. Peters.  The architect was Gottfried I. Norrman, a Swedish immigrant.  The house incorporates references to the Peters family, such as tiles depicting the Philadelphia Fish and Chowder Society founded by Edward's great-grandfather Richard Peters, Jr. Edward's father, also named Richard Peters, was instrumental in the founding and transformation of  the small town of Marthasvillle into Atlanta. Edward inherited Richard's railroad and trolley interests in 1889.

The Peters House survived the Great Atlanta Fire of 1917, when houses between North Avenue and Ponce de Leon Avenue were dynamited as a firebreak. After the death of Peters' daughter-in-law in 1970 the house was threatened with demolition, but it became The Mansion restaurant, operated by Bill Swearingen three years later.

The interiors have been largely preserved, although a fire in 2000 caused the restaurant to close. In 2005 the house was acquired by the Savannah College of Art and Design. A full restoration of Ivy Hall was undertaken, reopening on October 3, 2008. A portion of the grounds was developed with housing.

Photo gallery

See link for more photos.

References

External links

Edward C. Peters House, National Park Service Atlanta
Ivy Hall, Savannah College of Art and Design
Edward C. Peters House, Atlanta Urban Design Commission

Photos of Peters House/Ivy Hall (inside and outside)

Houses on the National Register of Historic Places in Georgia (U.S. state)
Historic American Buildings Survey in Georgia (U.S. state)
Queen Anne architecture in Georgia (U.S. state)
Houses in Atlanta
Houses completed in 1883
National Register of Historic Places in Atlanta
City of Atlanta-designated historic sites
Old Fourth Ward
1883 establishments in Georgia (U.S. state)